Jacques Patrick (born January 7, 1997) is an American football running back for the San Antonio Brahmas of the XFL. He played college football at Florida State.

College career
After playing high school football at Timber Creek High School in Orlando, Florida, Patrick committed to Florida State over offers from Ohio State, Alabama, Texas A&M, and Arizona, among others. Patrick spent the 2015 and 2016 seasons as the backup to Dalvin Cook. In 2017, Patrick shared carries with freshman Cam Akers. In 2017, Patrick had 118 rushing attempts for 638 yards and 6 touchdowns, averaging 5.8 yards per rush with his season long being 68 yards. During a game against Louisville during the 2017 season, Patrick suffered an injury to his knee. He would return later in the season to play Clemson. On January 10, 2018, Patrick announced he would return for his senior season at FSU and not declare early for the 2018 NFL Draft.

Statistics

Professional career

Tampa Bay Vipers
Patrick was drafted by the Tampa Bay Vipers during the 2020 XFL Draft. He had his contract terminated when the league suspended operations on April 10, 2020.

Cincinnati Bengals
Patrick signed with the Cincinnati Bengals of the NFL on April 17, 2020. He was waived on September 5, 2020 and signed to the practice squad the next day. He signed a reserve/future contract on January 4, 2021.

On August 31, 2021, Patrick was waived by the Bengals and re-signed to the practice squad the next day.

San Francisco 49ers
On September 21, 2021, Patrick was signed by the San Francisco 49ers off the Bengals practice squad. He was waived on October 12, 2021, and re-signed to the practice squad six days later. He was released on November 2, 2021.

Carolina Panthers
On December 7, 2021, Patrick was signed to the Carolina Panthers practice squad. He was released on December 21, 2021.

Baltimore Ravens
On January 4, 2022, Patrick was signed to the Baltimore Ravens practice squad.

Cincinnati Bengals (second stint) 
On July 28, 2022, he was signed by the Bengals for a second time. He was waived on August 30.

San Antonio Brahmas 
On November 17, 2022, Patrick was drafted by the San Antonio Brahmas of the XFL.

Personal life
His younger brother Peter Hayes received scholarship offers from FSU and Ohio State in 2014 while still in the eighth grade. Jacques is also the nephew of musician Curtis “50 Cent” Jackson.

References

External links
Florida State bio

Living people
1997 births
American football running backs
Baltimore Ravens players
Carolina Panthers players
Cincinnati Bengals players
Florida State Seminoles football players
Players of American football from Orlando, Florida
San Antonio Brahmas players
San Francisco 49ers players
Tampa Bay Vipers players
Timber Creek High School alumni